RHEB also known as Ras homolog enriched in brain (RHEB) is a GTP-binding protein that is ubiquitously expressed in humans and other mammals. The protein is largely involved in the mTOR pathway and the regulation of the cell cycle.

RHEB is a recently discovered member of the Ras superfamily. Being a relative of Ras, the overexpression of RHEB can be seen in multiple human carcinomas. For this reason, ways to inhibit RHEB to control the mTOR pathway are studied as possible treatments for uncontrollable tumor cell growth in several diseases, especially in tuberous sclerosis.

Structure 

Rheb is a 21 kDa protein monomer composed of 184 amino acids. The first 169 amino acids by the N-terminus make up the GTPase domain, and the remaining amino acids are part of a hypervariable region ending at the C-terminus in a CAAX motif (C – cysteine, A – aliphatic amino acid, X – C-terminus amino acid).

The protein is a lipid-anchored, cell-membrane protein with five repeats of the RAS-related GTP-binding region. Also present are “switch” regions, I and II, which undergo conformational changes when shuttling between GTP-bound(activated) and GDP-bound(inactive) forms.

RHEB is expressed by the RHEB gene in humans. Three pseudogenes have been mapped, two on chromosome 10 and one on chromosome 22.

Function

Activation of mTORC1 

RHEB is vital in regulation of growth and cell cycle progression due to its role in the insulin/TOR/S6K signaling pathway. Mechanistic Target of Rapamycin Complex 1 (mTORC1) is a serine/threonine kinase whose activation leads to phosphorylation cascades within the cell that lead to cell growth and proliferation. RHEB localizes at the lysosome to activate mTORC1 and Rag7 proteins localize mTORC1 to the lysosome and the Ragulator-Rag complex, allowing RHEB to activate the protein. RHEB acts as an activator for mTORC1 in its GTP-bound form, therefore GTP-bound RHEB activates cell growth and proliferation within the cell.

mTORC1 independent functions 

RHEB can serve as a regulator, for other proteins independent from mTORC1.  For example, RHEB is an activator for nucleotide synthesis by binding carbamoyl-phosphate synthetase 2, aspartate transcarbamylase, and dihydroorotase (CAD), an enzyme required for de novo pyrimidine nucleotide synthesis. An increased nucleotide pool within the cell can lead to increased cell proliferation. mTORC1 is also a regulator for CAD, so both RHEB and mTORC1 are involved with the control of nucleotide level within the cell. 5' adenosine-monophosphate-activated protein kinase (AMPK) has also been found to be an effector for RHEB. AMPK is a protein kinase that begins a phosphorylation cascade leading to autophagy. In rat studies, RHEB activates AMPK. RHEB has also been found to interact with effectors upstream in the mTOR pathway. Phospholipase D1 (PLD1) is upstream in the mTOR pathway and serves as a positive effector for mTORC1.

Other functions 

RHEB may be involved in neural plasticity. This function is novel and not typically associated with the Ras proteins. Deficiency of RHEB in the forebrain of mice embryos is associated with decreased myelinization due to a decrease of mature oligodendrocytes.

In studies of RHEB knockout mice, it was shown through hematoxylin-eosin staining that heart development is highly impaired. The cardiac myocytes do not sufficiently grow in size, indicating that RHEB mTOR function is required. This suggested that RHEB and the activation of the mTOR pathway is a necessity for proper cardiac development in mice embryos.

Differences from Ras superfamily 
RHEB functions differently compared to other proteins in the Ras superfamily. Similar to those in the Ras superfamily, the protein has GTPase activity and shuttles between a GDP-bound form and a GTP-bound form, and farnesylation of the protein is required for this activity. However, unlike those in the Ras superfamily, conformational change when shuttling between forms only affects switch I, while switch II remains relatively stable, due to difference in secondary structure. Ras switch II forms a long α-helical structure between shuttling, while RHEB switch II adopts a more atypical conformation allowing for novel functions. Such a conformation causes a decreased intrinsic rate of GTP hydrolysis as compared to RAS due to the catalytic Asp65 in the switch II region of RHEB being blocked from the active site.

Regulation 
GTP hydrolysis activity of RHEB is intrinsically slow and the GTP-bound form is more common, thus RHEB is more likely active than not active within the cell. Its activity is strongly regulated within the cell by tumor-suppressant proteins that form the TSC complex. Specifically, the TSC2 subunit, tuberin of the complex interacts with and inhibits RHEB to regulate the protein. Tuberin stimulates RHEB to hydrolyze GTP, thus inactivating it.

Tuberous sclerosis 

Tuberous sclerosis is an autosomal dominant disease in which the genes required to express the tumor-suppressant proteins that form the TSC complex is mutated or missing, so the TSC complex is unable to function properly. This could lead to the disregulation of many signalling proteins and effectors within the cell, including RHEB. Unregulated activity of RHEB can lead to uncontrollable cell growth and cell division which could ultimately lead to formation of tumors.

Interactions 

RHEB has been shown to interact with:

 Ataxia telangiectasia mutated (ATM) 
 Ataxia telangiectasia and Rad3 related (ATR)
 5' AMP-activated protein kinase (AMPK)
 RAF proto-oncogene serine/threonine-protein kinase (C-Raf) 
 mammalian Target of Rapamycin Complex 1 (mTORC1),
 Phospholipase D1 (PLD1)
 Regulatory-associated protein of mTOR (RPTOR)
 Tuberous sclerosis complex (TSC) and
 Carbamoyl-phosphate synthetase 2, aspartate transcarbamoylase, dihydroorotase (CAD)

References

Further reading

External links 
 

EC 3.6.5